Canalispira is a genus of very small sea snails, marine gastropod mollusks or micromollusks in the family Cystiscidae.

Species
Species within the genus Canalispira include:
Canalispira attentia (Laseron, 1957)
Canalispira aurea Garcia, 2006
 Canalispira columellaria Boyer, 2018
Canalispira fallax (Smith, 1903)
Canalispira infirma (Laseron, 1957)
Canalispira kerni Garcia, 2007
Canalispira lipei Garcia, 2007
Canalispira minor (Dall, 1927)
Canalispira olivellaeformis Jousseaume, 1875
Canalispira replicata (Melvill, 1912)
Canalispira shacklefordi (Preston, 1915)
Canalispira umuhlwa Kilburn, 1990
Species brought into synonymy
 Canalispira fluctuata McCleery & Wakefield, 2007: synonym of Osvaldoginella fluctuata (McCleery & Wakefield, 2007) (original combination)
Canalispira gomezi (Espinosa & Ortea, 1997): synonym of Osvaldoginella gomezi Espinosa & Ortea, 1997
 Canalispira hoffi (Moolenbeek & Faber, 1991): synonym of Osvaldoginella hoffi (Moolenbeek & Faber, 1991)
Canalispira ornata McCleery & Wakefield, 2007: synonym of Osvaldoginella gomezi Espinosa & Ortea, 1997 (original combination)
Canalispira phantasia McCleery & Wakefield, 2007: synonym of Osvaldoginella phantasia (McCleery & Wakefield, 2007) (original combination)

References

Further reading 
 Laseron, C. F. (1957). A new classification of the Australian Marginellidae (Mollusca), with a review of species from the Solanderian and Dampierian zoogeographical provinces. Australian Journal of Marine and Freshwater Research. 8(3): 274-311
 Coovert G. A. & Coovert H. K. (1995). "Revision of the supraspecific classification of marginelliform gastropods". The Nautilus 109(2-3): 43-110.

External links
 Jousseaume F. (1875). Coquilles de la famille des marginelles. Monographie. Revue et Magazin de Zoologie. ser. 3, 3: 164-271; 429-435
 McCleery T. & Wakefield A. (2007). "A review of the enigmatic genus Canalispira Jousseaume, 1875 (Gastropoda: Cystiscidae) with the description of three new species from the western Atlantic". Novapex 8(1): 1-10